Obdurate may refer to:
 , a O-class destroyer of the Royal Navy
 , an Admiralty M-class destroyer that was in operation from 1916 to 1921
 Obdurate Ltd., publisher of music magazine Zero Tolerance

See also
Refractory Obdurate, 2014 album by American rock band Wovenhand
Obturation (verb form: obturate), necessary blockage or fitment of a firearm's barrel by a deformed soft projectile